The 2011 Open d'Orléans was a professional tennis tournament played on hard courts. It was the seventh edition of the tournament which was part of the 2011 ATP Challenger Tour. It took place in Orléans, France between 17 and 23 October 2011.

ATP entrants

Seeds

 1 Rankings are as of October 10, 2011.

Other entrants
The following players received wildcards into the singles main draw:
  Michaël Llodra
  Feliciano López
  Benoît Paire
  Vincent Millot

The following players received entry from the qualifying draw:
  Pierre-Hugues Herbert
  Andis Juška
  Mathieu Rodrigues
  Laurent Rochette

The following players received entry as a lucky loser into the singles main draw:
  Simon Cauvard
  Yann Marti

Champions

Singles

 Michaël Llodra def.  Arnaud Clément, 7–5, 6–1

Doubles

 Pierre-Hugues Herbert /  Nicolas Renavand def.  David Škoch /  Simone Vagnozzi, 7–5, 6–3

External links
Official Website
ITF Search 
ATP official site